José Luis Arilla (born 5 March 1941) is a Spanish former tennis player.  He was the partner of Manuel Santana in Davis Cup matches.  He only played 16 matches in the Open Era, and his best result in those times were the quarters of the 1968 Torneo Godó.

Grand Slam finals

Doubles (1 runner-up)

References

External links
 
 
 

Tennis players from Catalonia
Spanish male tennis players
1941 births
Living people
Mediterranean Games gold medalists for Spain
Mediterranean Games bronze medalists for Spain
Mediterranean Games medalists in tennis
Competitors at the 1963 Mediterranean Games
Competitors at the 1967 Mediterranean Games
Tennis players from Barcelona
Grand Slam (tennis) champions in boys' doubles
Australian Championships (tennis) junior champions